Private Samuel Needham VC (16 August 1885 − 4 November 1918) was a British Army soldier and an English recipient of the Victoria Cross (VC), the highest and most prestigious award for gallantry in the face of the enemy that can be awarded to British and Commonwealth forces.

Details
He was 33 years old, and a private in the 1/5th Battalion, The Bedfordshire Regiment, British Army during the First World War when the following deed took place for which he was awarded the VC.

On 10/11 September 1918 at Kefr Kasim, Palestine, one of our patrols was attacked by the enemy in considerable force, supported by very heavy fire. At a critical moment Private Needham ran back, turned to face a fresh body of the enemy which was approaching and fired rapidly at about 40 Turks at only 30 yards range. This action checked the enemy and just gave the patrol commander time to get his men together again. Half of the patrol were casualties but they managed to get back all their wounded. Private Needham's action in standing up to the enemy all alone did much to inspire the men and undoubtedly saved the situation.

He took his own life, being killed by a self inflicted wound (ref: Mick Brand) at Kantara, Egypt on 4 November 1918.<ref>Death Certificate 

His VC is displayed at the Bedfordshire and Hertfordshire Regimental Collection at the Wardown Park Museum, Luton, Bedfordshire.

References

Regimental Bio

1885 births
1918 deaths
Burials in Egypt
British World War I recipients of the Victoria Cross
Bedfordshire and Hertfordshire Regiment soldiers
British military personnel killed in World War I
British Army personnel of World War I
Royal Army Service Corps soldiers
People from West Lindsey District
Accidental deaths in Egypt
Deaths by firearm in Egypt
Firearm accident victims
British Army recipients of the Victoria Cross
Military personnel from Lincolnshire